"In The Pound, Near Breaktime" is a science fiction short story written in 1995 by Kent Brewster.  It was nominated for the 1997 Nebula Award for Best Short Story.

Plot summary
The story is about a desk clerk who is checking in all the animals that are brought to the pound.  It explores the idea of what might happen if unwanted pets, strays and pesky animals were intelligent enough to talk.

Footnotes

Science fiction short stories
1995 short stories
Works originally published in Tomorrow Speculative Fiction